Walter Carl Beckham (May 16, 1916 – May 31, 1996) was a United States Army Air Forces officer during World War II and an American ace credited with 18 air-to-air victories. He remained in the Air Force after the war, obtained a Ph.D. in physics and was a nuclear weapons scientist.

Early life
Beckham was born on May 12, 1916, in Paxton, Florida.

Military career
Beckham became a United States Army Air Corps cadet in early 1941, Upon graduation from Aviation Cadet Class 41I(SE) in December, he was commissioned a Second Lieutenant and assigned to the Panama Canal Zone and Ecuador. After his return to the US, he was promoted to Captain and was assigned to the 351st Fighter Squadron of the 353rd Fighter Group, flying Republic P-47 Thunderbolts.

World War II
In mid-1943, the 353rd FG was initially stationed at RAF Goxhill in Lincolnshire, England, before moving to RAF Metfield in Suffolk, England in August 1943.

After switching its base to Metfield, the 353rd FG flew its first combat mission. In late September, Beckham scored his first kill, an Fw 190 over Nantes, France. Credited with a second kill, a Bf 109 on October 6, and then on October 10 he became a flying ace by destroying three twin-engined Messerschmitt Bf 110s.

During the winter of 1943-44, his score mounted, with victories frequently coming in pairs. By mid-February, Beckham had 18 victories, which at that time, made him the top scoring ace of the Eighth Air Force. On February 22, while on his 57th combat mission, he was hit by flak over Ostheim, Germany and bailed out of his P-47D successfully near Bergen-Neukirchen, but was captured and remained a Prisoner of War until he was released during April 1945.

Post war
After his release in April 1945, Beckham was promoted to Lieutenant Colonel and stayed with the United States Air Force. He earned a PhD in Physics in 1962 and joined the Air Force Weapons Laboratory at Kirtland Air Force Base as chief scientist, working on nuclear weapons. Beckham remained active in this field until his retirement on 1969 as Colonel in the USAF.

Later life
Beckham continued his career as nuclear scientist in civilian life until he retired in Albuquerque, New Mexico. Beckham died in Albuquerque on May 31, 1996.

Awards and decorations
Beckham earned many decorations, including:

See also
Kirtland Air Force Base
Edward Teller

References

Further reading

External links

1916 births
1996 deaths
American World War II flying aces
Recipients of the Air Medal
Recipients of the Silver Star
Recipients of the Distinguished Service Cross (United States)
United States Army Air Forces officers
American prisoners of war in World War II
United States Army Air Forces pilots of World War II
Recipients of the Legion of Merit
Recipients of the Distinguished Flying Cross (United States)
20th-century American physicists
United States Air Force colonels